ESPNU is an American multinational digital cable and satellite sports television channel owned by ESPN Inc., a joint venture between the Disney Media Networks division of The Walt Disney Company (which owns a controlling 80% stake) and the Hearst Communications (which owns the remaining 20%). The channel is primarily dedicated to coverage of college athletics, and is also used as an additional outlet for general ESPN programming. ESPNU is based alongside its sister networks at ESPN's headquarters in Bristol, Connecticut.

As of November 2021, ESPNU reaches approximately 51 million television households in the United States – a drop of 24% from nearly a decade ago.

History
The network was launched on March 4, 2005, with its first broadcast originating from the site of Gallagher-Iba Arena on the Oklahoma State University campus in Stillwater, Oklahoma. The network's first live event was a semifinal game of the Ohio Valley Conference men's basketball tournament between Southeast Missouri State University and Eastern Kentucky University. The network was launched as a response to rival College Sports Television (CSTV) (now CBS Sports Network). ESPN was also being investigated by the U.S. Justice Department on allegations of "warehousing" collegiate sporting events from certain conferences, or signing a deal with a conference for all their games, but only televising a small number and not allowing the conference to make other arrangements for television broadcasts.

ESPN and XOS Technologies entered into a partnership for college athletics websites to compete directly with CSTV's growing internet presence. On August 28, 2006, ESPNU launched a new SportsCenter spin-off focusing entirely on college sports. The program, SportsCenterU, was originally scheduled to be broadcast from ESPN's headquarters in Bristol, Connecticut, however ESPN instead chose to originate the show from Charlotte. Mike Hall was the program's lead anchor until August 2007, when he left for the new Big Ten Network. He was replaced by Mike Gleason and Lowell Galindo. The two are joined on-set by color commentators that vary depending on the sports season.

The same day as SportsCenterUs debut, ESPNU launched the website ESPNU.com. The site included live-streaming of college sports events, a multimedia player dedicated to college sports, podcasts and ESPN Motion clips of studio programming from the ESPNU television network.

ESPNU expanded its live programming to water polo by broadcasting its first-ever water polo match between the women's teams of Princeton University and Bucknell University on March 28, 2009, from DeNunzio Pool in Princeton, New Jersey.

In addition to its collegiate sports coverage, ESPNU has simulcast ESPN Radio's midday program over its airwaves since 2008, with the exception of a brief period between 2011 and 2012. The program airing for the majority of that time was The Herd with Colin Cowherd, which has since moved to Fox Sports Radio and is simulcast on Fox Sports 1. Following Cowherd's departure and several weeks of guest hosts taking over the timeslot, The Dan Le Batard Show with Stugotz became the permanent replacement for The Herd.

On April 26, 2017, as part of a larger series of company-wide cuts, it was announced that ESPNU's studio operations would be re-located from Charlotte to ESPN's main headquarters in Bristol, Connecticut. Less than 10 employees were laid off as part of the cuts. SEC Network and ESPN Events continue to operate out of Charlotte.

On August 8, 2017, ESPNU aired a marathon of lesser-known and unconventional non-college sports as "ESPN 8: The Ocho"—an homage to a fictitious eighth ESPN channel portrayed in the film DodgeBall: A True Underdog Story, which aired events that were "almost a sport". The stunt was reprised the following year on ESPN2.

On August 31, 2017, as part of an extension of ESPN's agreements with the service, Sirius XM's channel College Sports Nation was relaunched as ESPNU Radio. The channel carries audio simulcasts of ESPN college sports studio programming, as well as other programs and event coverage.

Carriage
On May 19, 2009, ESPN announced it had reached a carriage agreement with Comcast, which allows the cable provider to carry ESPNU on a widely distributed digital cable tier, instead of a less popular sports tier. ESPNU was added to most Comcast systems in time for the start of the 2009–10 college football season. This ended several years of negotiations and somewhat of a feud between Comcast and ESPN over carriage of ESPNU.

On that same date, ESPNU reached a new carriage agreement with DirecTV, which moved the channel from the satellite provider's add-on "Sports Pack" to its basic "Choice" package on July 1, 2009, swapping channels and packages with ESPN Classic. Cablevision added ESPNU to its systems on March 23, 2010.

ESPNU is carried on PlayStation Vue, and Sling TV.

Outside the United States, ESPNU became available in Mexico in 2017.

Dish Network lawsuit
On August 4, 2009 Dish Network sued ESPN for $1 million in a federal lawsuit, alleging that ESPN breached its contract by not extending the same carriage terms that the programmer provided to Comcast and DirecTV for ESPNU and ESPN Classic. The lawsuit claims ESPN violated the "Most Favored Nations" clause.

The next day, ESPN announced it would fight the lawsuit and said in a press release: "We have repeatedly advised Dish that we are in full compliance with our agreement and have offered them a distribution opportunity with respect to ESPNU and ESPN Classic consistent with the rest of the industry. We will not renegotiate settled contracts and will vigorously defend this legal action, the apparent sole purpose of which is to get a better deal."

Dish Network moved the channel from its "Classic Gold 250" package to its "Classic Bronze 100" package on September 30, 2009. However, it claimed that the move had nothing to do with the lawsuit.

Coverage rights

ESPNU has rights to sporting events from the following collegiate athletic conferences:

 American Athletic Conference
 Atlantic Coast Conference (ACC)
 Big 12 Conference
 Big Ten Conference
 Ivy League
 Mid-American Conference (MAC)
 Mid-Eastern Athletic Conference (MEAC)
 Missouri Valley Conference
 Missouri Valley Football Conference
 Pac-12 Conference
 Southeastern Conference (SEC)
 Southwestern Athletic Conference (SWAC)
 Sun Belt Conference
 Western Athletic Conference (WAC)
 West Coast Conference (WCC)

List of programs broadcast by ESPNU

Current

Studio
ESPNU Bracketology (2006–present)
ESPNU Coaches Spotlight (2006–present)
Give 'N Go (2007–present)
Inside the Big East (2006–present)
ESPNU Inside the Polls (2005–present)
ESPNU Recruiting Insider (2006–present)
SportsCenterU (2006–present)
College Football Live

Live sports programs
ESPNU College Baseball (2005–present) Regular Season & select NCAA Tournament games LIVE
ESPNU College Basketball (2005–present) 
ESPNU College Football (2005–present) 
ESPNU College Hockey (2005–present) Coverage of the Men's DI NCAA tournament regionals and the Women's National Collegiate Frozen Four (since 2021); select regular season games from the Big Ten (since 2013) and Hockey East (beginning 2022)
ESPNU College Lacrosse (2005–present) Includes D1 Men's Tournament until Semis when it moves to ESPN 2. 
ESPNU College Soccer (2005–present) NCAA D1 Men's Semifinals Finals & Women's Semifinals & Finals as well as select men's & women's regular season games  
ESPNU College Softball (2005–present) Regular Season & select NCAA Tournament games LIVE
ESPNU College Volleyball (2005–present) Women's games as well as Beach Volleyball Tournament Day 1 
ESPN Megacast (2006–2007 as ESPN Full Circle, 2015–present)
High School Showcase (2005–present)
NHL on ESPN  (2022–present) - Playoff broadcasts
NBA on ESPN  (2015–2017?) - Playoff broadcasts
NBA G League  (2015–present) Mainly playoff games or G League showcase (since no fans are allowed to watch live at the stadium)
International Champions Cup (2018–present) When there is more than one game on or an early morning game in United States Local Time
United Soccer League (2018–present) a secondary network for the game of the week when ESPN2 or ESPNews has a live event at the games start
FIL World Lacrosse Championships (2018–present) 
ESPN Radio TV Broadcasts Only when ESPNews has a planned live sports "game" event cuts off there coverage of the broadcast will it be on ESPNU. 
Formula One (2018–present) Live Telecast of Sky Sports F1 Grand Prix Practice 2 Coverage Only as ESPN 2 airs Practice 1 & Qualifying Sessions with ESPNews & Major Races On ESPN/ABC
Pan American Games (2011, 2015 & 2019) English coverage of the games when ESPN 2 or ESPN has other sports coverage. Just a loop around of the main events/matches going on at that moment, however every match is in Spanish only on ESPN 3
Summer of Next (2013–present) Showcases the best High School Athletes in the semi-finals & championship matches of some of the best tournaments in High School Lacrosse, Basketball, Softball, & Baseball. It ends with the best High School Football teams, players & games in the first weekend of the High School Football season with a three day event on the ESPN Networks.
The Basketball Tournament Quarterfinal matches that ESPN or ESPN 2 can not show due to other sports.
Microsoft Excel Collegiate Challenge Live annual competition with more than 2,800 registered students from 93 countries and 596 universities and colleges.

Original series
Faces of Sports (2005–present)
Honor Roll (2005–present)
The Season: Ole Miss Football (2018–present)

Former
Summer House (2006–2007)
The U (2005–2006)
UNITE (2012–2013)

See also

 List of ESPNU personalities
 College football on television
 Men's college basketball on television

Competitors
 CBS Sports Network
 Fox Sports
 Big Ten Network
 Fox College Sports
 Fox Sports 1
 Fox Sports 2
 NBCSN
 Pac-12 Network

References

External links
 ESPNU official website
 ESPNU program listings

Companies based in Charlotte, North Carolina
ESPN media outlets
Disney acquisitions
The Walt Disney Company subsidiaries
Television channels and stations established in 2005
English-language television stations in the United States
ESPN College Basketball
College sports television networks